Helen Maria Edlund (born April 11, 1968) is a Swedish female curler.

Teams

Women's

Mixed

Private life

References

External links

Val-curling med osäker utgång - Helena Edlund

Living people
1968 births
Swedish female curlers